Carrie Chapman Catt Hall is an administrative building completed in 1892, at Iowa State University which currently houses the College of Liberal Arts and Sciences, the Department of Philosophy and Religious Studies, and the Carrie Chapman Center for Women and Politics. The building is named for Carrie Chapman Catt, an American women's rights activist and founder of the League of Women Voters. She graduated from Iowa State in 1880 at the top of her class.

History 
Originally known as Agriculture Hall, the building was completed in 1893, and housed the Agriculture, Horticulture, and Veterinary Science departments. In the early 1900s, the Department of Agricultural Engineering moved into the building which was renamed Agricultural Engineering Building until 1922, when the department moved into its own building. It once housed the laboratory of George Washington Carver, the first African American graduate student and first African American faculty member at Iowa State. Following this move, the building was renamed Botany Hall, then Old Botany Hall, after the Botany department moved to Bessey Hall in 1968. Although the building was condemned in 1966, Old Botany was partially occupied until spring of 1994. In 1985, the building was placed on the National Register of Historic Places. The building's interior was gutted and underwent a $5 million renovation. The Iowa Board of Regents approved changing the building's name to Carrie Chapman Catt Hall. The building was rededicated in 1995, at which point it was given its current name and purpose as the administrative office for the College of Liberal Arts and Sciences.

Plaza of Heroines  

Located in front of Catt Hall, the Plaza of Heroines is a brick filled area containing over 3,600 bricks dedicated to women who have made an impact on their families, communities, and society as role models.

References
History of Campus Buildings
Catt Hall sparks controversy
'Workers begin to lay bricks at Catt Hall's Plaza of Heroines', Iowa State Daily, July 18, 1995.
Catt Hall Picture
To fund the impossible dream. (renovation of Carrie Chapman Catt Hall at Iowa State University of Science and Technology)
History Opens Its Heart to Carrie Chapman Catt
CATT (CARRIE CHAPMAN) HALL, ISU

External links 
Plaza of Heroines Website

Iowa State University buildings and structures
Buildings and structures completed in 1892
National Register of Historic Places in Story County, Iowa
University and college buildings on the National Register of Historic Places in Iowa
1892 establishments in Iowa